Silver Bells Kindergarten & Girls' High School is a private school in Chattogram, Bangladesh.

See also
 List of colleges in Chittagong

References

External links

Girls' schools in Bangladesh
Private schools in Bangladesh